Håkan Pettersson (11 May 1949 – 10 May 2008) was a Swedish professional ice hockey player.

He competed as a member of the Sweden men's national ice hockey team at the 1972 Winter Olympics held in Japan.

References

External links

1949 births
2008 deaths
Olympic ice hockey players of Sweden
Timrå IK players
Swedish ice hockey forwards
Ice hockey players at the 1972 Winter Olympics
People from Sundsvall
Sportspeople from Västernorrland County